Christopher Troode (born 19 February 1983) is an Australian former athlete.

A native of Perth, Troode was a member of Australia's gold medal-winning 4 × 400 metres relay team at the 2006 Commonwealth Games in Melbourne (with John Steffensen, Mark Ormrod & Clinton Hill). He was the only addition to the team which won silver at the 2004 Olympics and ran the second leg of the final.

In 2009, Troode won a 4 × 400 metres gold medal at the World University Games in Belgrade, where he also qualified fastest for the 400 metres individual final (but did not start).

Troode's wife Lyndsay was a sprinter at the 2014 Commonwealth Games and is the daughter of athlete Coleen Pekin.

References

External links
Chris Troode at World Athletics

1983 births
Living people
Australian male sprinters
Athletes from Perth, Western Australia
Commonwealth Games gold medallists for Australia
Commonwealth Games gold medallists in athletics
Athletes (track and field) at the 2006 Commonwealth Games
Universiade gold medalists for Australia
Universiade gold medalists in athletics (track and field)
Medalists at the 2009 Summer Universiade
Medallists at the 2006 Commonwealth Games